Melvern is a city in Osage County, Kansas, United States, along the Marais des Cygnes River.  As of the 2020 census, the population of the city was 356.

History
Melvern was laid out in 1870. It was named after the Malvern Hills, in Worcestershire, England.

The first post office in Melvern was established in June 1870.

Geography
Melvern is located at  (38.507446, -95.638332).

Demographics

Melvern is part of the Topeka, Kansas Metropolitan Statistical Area.

2010 census
As of the census of 2010, there were 385 people, 159 households, and 109 families living in the city. The racial makeup of the city was 96.6% White, 0.3% African American, 0.8% Asian, 0.3% from other races, and 2.1% from two or more races. Hispanic or Latino of any race were 2.3% of the population.

There were 159 households, of which 30.8% had children under the age of 18 living with them, 52.2% were married couples living together, 8.8% had a female householder with no husband present, 7.5% had a male householder with no wife present, and 31.4% were non-families. 27.0% of all households were made up of individuals, and 10% had someone living alone who was 65 years of age or older. The average household size was 2.39 and the average family size was 2.86.

The median age in the city was 40.8 years. 24.7% of residents were under the age of 18; 6% were between the ages of 18 and 24; 25.2% were from 25 to 44; 24.9% were from 45 to 64; and 19.2% were 65 years of age or older. The gender makeup of the city was 48.6% male and 51.4% female.

2000 census
As of the census of 2000, there were 429 people, 173 households, and 120 families living in the city. The racial makeup of the city was 98.14% White, 0.70% Native American, 0.23% from other races, and 0.93% from two or more races. Hispanic or Latino of any race were 0.93% of the population.

There were 173 households, out of which 31.8% had children under the age of 18 living with them, 56.1% were married couples living together, 10.4% had a female householder with no husband present, and 30.6% were non-families. 28.9% of all households were made up of individuals, and 14.5% had someone living alone who was 65 years of age or older. The average household size was 2.47 and the average family size was 3.00.

In the city, the population was spread out, with 26.3% under the age of 18, 6.8% from 18 to 24, 28.9% from 25 to 44, 17.9% from 45 to 64, and 20.0% who were 65 years of age or older. The median age was 37 years. For every 100 females, there were 98.6 males. For every 100 females age 18 and over, there were 85.9 males.

The median income for a household in the city was $32,321, and the median income for a family was $50,833. Males had a median income of $30,313 versus $17,143 for females. The per capita income for the city was $16,206. About 5.3% of families and 9.2% of the population were below the poverty line, including 4.5% of those under age 18 and 9.2% of those age 65 or over.

Education
The community is served by Marais des Cygnes Valley USD 456 public school district.  The district high school is Marais des Cygnes Valley High School. Mascot is Trojans.

Prior to school unification, the Melvern High School mascot was Panthers. The Melvern Panthers won the Kansas State High School boys class B basketball championship in 1962.

Parks and Recreation
 Melvern Lake

References

Further reading

External links

 City of Melvern
 Melvern - Directory of Public Officials
 Melvern city map, KDOT

Cities in Kansas
Cities in Osage County, Kansas
Topeka metropolitan area, Kansas